Raúl Campero Núñez (November 29, 1919 – October 31, 1980) was a Mexican Olympic medalist. He was born in San Blas, Nayarit.

References
Raúl Campero's profile at Sports Reference.com

1919 births
1980 deaths
Olympic bronze medalists for Mexico
Equestrians at the 1948 Summer Olympics
Olympic equestrians of Mexico
Mexican male equestrians
Olympic medalists in equestrian
Sportspeople from Nayarit
Medalists at the 1948 Summer Olympics